The Tanggula (Dangla) railway station is a railway station located in Amdo County, Tibet Autonomous Region, China, near the border with the Tanggula Town, Qinghai Province. The railway station has three tracks, one of them served by a platform, and another one served by a very short stub platform.

Since its construction, Tanggula Station has been the highest railway station in the world.

Introduction 
This unstaffed station on the Qingzang railway opened for service on July 1, 2006.

There are 3 rail tracks in the station. The location of the station was specially chosen for the view from the platform.

Schedules 
As of 2010, no passenger transport service was available since the region is uninhabited. Although the train may stop at the station to wait for another train coming from the opposite direction to pass, passengers are required to remain on the train.

See also 

 List of highest railway stations in the world
 List of stations on Qingzang railway
 Qingzang railway
 Tanggula Pass

References

Stations on the Qinghai–Tibet Railway
Railway stations in Tibet
Amdo